The 2009 Team Ice Racing World Championship was the 31st edition of the Team World Championship. The final was held on ?, 2009, in Inzell, in Germany. Russia won their 15th title.

Final Classification

See also 
 2009 Individual Ice Racing World Championship
 2009 Speedway World Cup in classic speedway
 2009 Speedway Grand Prix in classic speedway

References 

Ice speedway competitions
World